Molorchus eburneus is a species of beetle in the family Cerambycidae. It was described by Linsley in 1931.

References

Cerambycinae
Beetles described in 1931